Municipal Palace may refer to the following buildings:

Chiantla Municipal Palace, Guatemala
Banca Giuratale (Valletta), Malta
Banca Giuratale (Mdina), Malta
Municipal Palace,  León, Guanajuato, Mexico
Municipal Palace of Lima, Peru
Braga Municipal Palace, Portugal

See also
Municipal Building
City Hall (disambiguation)
Palacio Municipal (disambiguation)